David Mujiri may refer to:
 Davit Mujiri (born 1978), Georgian footballer
 David Mujiri (footballer, born 1999), Georgian footballer